My Wife's Relations is a 1922 American short comedy film directed by and starring Buster Keaton. Through a judicial error Buster finds himself married to a large domineering woman with an unfriendly father and four bullying brothers.

Cast
 Buster Keaton as The Husband
 Monte Collins as The Father (uncredited)
 Wheezer Dell as Brother (uncredited)
 Harry Madison as Brother (uncredited)
 Kate Price as Wife (uncredited)
 Joe Roberts as Brother (uncredited)
 Tom Wilson as Brother (uncredited)

See also
 Buster Keaton filmography

References

External links

 My Wife's Relations at the International Buster Keaton Society

1922 films
1922 short films
American silent short films
American black-and-white films
Silent American comedy films
American comedy short films
Films directed by Buster Keaton
Films produced by Joseph M. Schenck
Films with screenplays by Buster Keaton
Films directed by Edward F. Cline
1922 comedy films
1920s American films